The Political Parties, Elections and Referendums Act 2000 (c. 41) is an Act of Parliament of the United Kingdom that sets out how political parties, elections and referendums are to be regulated in the United Kingdom. It formed an important part of the constitutional reform programme implemented by the 1997 Labour Government, building on the Registration of Political Parties Act 1998 (c. 48) which was passed two years earlier.

Background

The Act was introduced after consultation with major political parties, and largely followed the recommendations of the Committee on Standards in Public Life (known at the time as the "Neill Committee" after its chairman), an independent body set-up by former Prime Minister John Major to consider ways of making politics more transparent. The committee set out its proposals in its report, The Funding of Political Parties in the United Kingdom.

The Act created an independent Electoral Commission to regulate political parties and their funding arrangements. It also required parties to submit statements of their accounts on a regular basis, and prohibited the receipt of funds from foreign or anonymous donors. Restrictions on campaign expenditure were also put in place, dictating the maximum amount that parties were able to spend.

Details

Registration of parties

The law gave the newly formed Electoral Commission a role in controlling the registration of political parties.

The requirement for parties to register with an official body, if they wished to be named on ballot papers, was the result of a fairly wide acceptance that the finances of political groups should be regulated to reduce the perception of underhand dealings.

In addition, political groups or individuals failing to register with the Commission would only be able to describe themselves as "Independent" on ballot papers, or else have a blank space instead of a description after their names—with the single exception of the Speaker of the House of Commons who is entitled to be described as: "The Speaker seeking re-election".

This built on the provisions of the Registration of Political Parties Act 1998, passed amid concern about voters being fooled by misleading ballot descriptions.

There is an annual fee for the registration of a political party.

Donations

Under the terms of the law, registered political parties are only allowed to accept donations in excess of £500 from "permissible donors", defined as either individuals on an electoral register in the United Kingdom, or political parties, companies, trade unions, or similar organisations that are registered in the country.

The provision of non-financial support to a registered party – such as subsidies or free materials – is counted as a donation. Each party is required to submit details of all donations received, whether by party headquarters or their subsidiary parts. Each report must provide sufficient information to show that a donor counts as a "permissible source".

Political parties on the separate register for Northern Ireland are exempt from the controls on accepting and reporting donations.

Expenditure
The Act places strict limits on the amount each party may spend in the run-up to the election (how that time period is defined depends on the type of election). The current limit for elections to the UK Parliament in Westminster stands at £30,000 per constituency contested within 365 days of a General Election, up to a maximum of £18.84 million.

The amount permitted to be spent by third-parties during Parliamentary elections to support or oppose candidates was increased from the previous limit of £5 (which had been held to be an impermissible restriction on freedom of expression by the European Convention on Human Rights in the case of Bowman v United Kingdom) to £500.

Referendums

The Act provides a basic framework to the running of all future referendums that are to be held under the jurisdiction of the Electoral Commission in pursuance of any provision made by a subsequent Act of Parliament in the following areas:

United Kingdom 
England
Northern Ireland
Scotland
Wales

The Act also makes the provision that in any future UK-wide referendum the chairperson of the Electoral Commission is appointed “Chief Counting Officer” for the United Kingdom or gives the power for the chairperson to appoint a Chief Counting Officer.

Controversy

In December 2006 Prime Minister Tony Blair and politicians of other parties were questioned by police as part of their investigation into the Cash for Honours affair. Part of their time was said to be spent looking at whether the Act had been breached by parties taking loans from supporters in return for nominations to the House of Lords. Unlike donations, loans did not have to be made public as long as they were made on "commercial terms”.

The Government later changed the law to require the declaration of all forms of loan, and asked a  former Clerk of the Crown in Chancery, Sir Hayden Phillips, to undertake a fundamental review of party funding arrangements. He reported in 2008.

In November 2007 the provisions of the Act were again the subject of scrutiny in the cases of Labour party donor David Abrahams and Scottish Labour leader Wendy Alexander.

In 2016, several UK police forces started investigations into allegations of election fraud, in the 2015 general election, specifically on the Conservatives breaching the spend limits permitted. The majority of allegations focus on the mis-representation of the "battle-bus" finances.

See also
List of political parties in the United Kingdom
Elections in the United Kingdom
Campaign finance
Campaign finance reform in the United States

References

External links
Political Parties, Elections and Referendums Act 2000
Website of the Committee on Standards in Public Life

Constitutional laws of the United Kingdom
United Kingdom Acts of Parliament 2000
Election law in the United Kingdom
Election legislation
Political parties in the United Kingdom
Referendums in the United Kingdom
Political funding in the United Kingdom